The Central District of Tafresh County is a district (bakhsh) in Tafresh County, Markazi Province, Iran. At the 2006 census, its population was 23,938, in 7,647 families.  The District has one city: Tafresh. The District has four rural districts (dehestan): Bazarjan Rural District, Kharrazan Rural District, Kuh Panah Rural District, and Rudbar Rural District.

References 

Tafresh County
Districts of Markazi Province